Manvo (also, Manes) is a town in the Lori Province of Armenia.

References 

Populated places in Lori Province